Mary Atkinson may refer to:
 M. E. Atkinson (Mary Evelyn Atkinson, 1899–1974), English children's writer
 Mary Atkinson (bailiff), first female court bailiff in the United States, in 1870 in Wyoming
 Mary Atkinson (Victoria roll of honour), 2001 inductee on the Victorian Honour Roll of Women, Australia